Totos District is one of six districts of the province Cangallo in Peru.

Geography 
Other mountains are listed below:

The largest lakes in the district are Llulluch'a Qucha and Lawra Qucha.

Ethnic groups 
The people in the district are mainly indigenous citizens of Quechua descent. Quechua is the language which the majority of the population (94.28%) learnt to speak in childhood, 5.40% of the residents started speaking using the Spanish language (2007 Peru Census).

References